Senha is a village in the Senha CD block in the Lohardaga Sadar subdivision of the Lohardaga district in the Indian state of Jharkhand.

Geography

Location                                 
Senha is located at

Area overview 
The map alongside shows an undulating plateau area with the hilly tract in the west and north-west. Three Bauxite mining centres are marked. It is an overwhelmingly rural district with 87.6% of the population living in the rural areas.

Note: The map alongside presents some of the notable locations in the district. All places marked in the map are linked in the larger full screen map.

Civic administration

Police station 
There is a police station at Senha.

CD block HQ 
The headquarters of Senha CD block are located at Senha village.

Demographics 
According to the 2011 Census of India, Senha had a total population of 7,011, of which 3,562 (51%) were males and 3,449 (49%) were females. Population in the age range 0–6 years was 1,034. The total number of literate persons in Senha was 4,530 (75.79% of the population over 6 years).

(*For language details see Senha block#Language and religion)

Education
Kasturba Gandhi Balika Vidyalaya is a Hindi-medium girls only institution established in 2006. It has facilities for teaching from class VI to class XII. The school has a playground, a library with 1,345 books and has 5 computers for learning and teaching purposes.

Sushila Devi Girls High School Senha is a Hindi-medium girls only institution established in 1984. it has facilities for teaching from class VII to class X. The school has a playground, a library with 230 books and has 2 computers for teaching and learning purposes.

St. Marks Middle School Senha is a Hindi-medium coeducational institution established in 1999. It has facilities for teaching from class I to class VIII. Coeducational high schools are about 10 km away.

References 

Villages in Lohardaga district